Myn M. Hoffman was the fourth Superintendent of the United States Navy Nurse Corps.

Early life
Myn M. Hoffman was born in Bradford, Illinois, on 12 May 1883. After several years as an educator, she attended St. Joseph's Hospital Training School for Nurses in Denver, Colorado, graduating in 1915.

Navy Nurse Corps career
Miss Hoffman entered the Navy Nurse Corps in February 1917 and was promoted to Chief Nurse two years later. During the First World War and in the post-war era, she served at several naval hospitals, including that at Washington, D.C.
In 1934, Chief Nurse Hoffman was appointed Assistant Superintendent of the Navy Nurse Corps and became the Corps' fourth Superintendent in January 1935. She retired from the Navy in October 1938. When Navy Nurses were included in the Navy's ranking system, she received the rank of Lieutenant Commander in recognition of her service as Superintendent of the Navy Nurse Corps.

Later life
Hoffman died in Bronxville, New York, on 5 January 1951.

Further reading

External links
Nurses and the U.S. Navy -- Overview and Special Image Selection Naval Historical Center
Myn M. Hoffman Naval Historical Center

1883 births
1951 deaths
American nursing administrators
United States Navy personnel of World War I
American women in World War I
Female nurses in World War I
Female United States Navy officers
United States Navy Nurse Corps officers